A list of films produced in Pakistan in 1977 (see 1977 in film) and in the Urdu language:

1977

See also
1977 in Pakistan

External links
 Search Pakistani film - IMDB.com

1977
Pakistani
Films